Vacquier is a French surname. Notable people with the surname include:

 Jean-Pierre Vaquier (1879–1924), French inventor and murderer
 Victor Vacquier (1907–2009), Russian geophysicist

See also
 Vacquiers

French-language surnames